Exceptional Minds (established in 2011) is the first American computer animation studio and non-profit digital arts school for young autistic adults. It is located in Sherman Oaks, Los Angeles, California.

Background
The first major project for Exceptional Minds (EM) was the end title sequence for Judy Moody and the Not Bummer Summer. In addition, EM students have also worked on post-production visual effects for films such as American Hustle (rotoscoping), Lawless (end credits), and Dawn of the Planet of the Apes (VFX roto work in stereo).

In September 2013, University of Southern California doctoral student Laura Cechanowicz released her documentary about EM titled Exceptional Minds in Transition for the USC School of Cinematic Arts video-based website, "Interacting with Autism". Later, in 2014, EM partnered with Sesame Street in an initiative that will spread "autism acceptance".

The first class of eight students graduated in June 2014, with Ed Asner serving as commencement speaker.

Filmography
Ant-Man and the Wasp: Quantumania (2023) - End credits
Spider-Man: No Way Home (2021) - End credits
Black Widow (2021) - Additional visual effects
Loki (2021) - End credits
Spider-Man: Far From Home (2019) - End credits
Avengers: Endgame (2019) - Additional visual effects and end credits
Avengers: Infinity War (2018) - Additional visual effects and end credits 
Black Panther (2018) - Additional visual effects and end credits 
Star Wars: The Last Jedi (2017) - Additional visual effects and end credits 
Thor: Ragnarok (2017) - Additional visual effects and end credits 
War for the Planet of the Apes (2017) - Additional visual effects 
Spider-Man: Homecoming (2017) - Additional visual effects and end credits 
The Mummy (2017) - Additional visual effects 
Guardians of the Galaxy Vol. 2 (2017) - End text credits 
The Fate of the Furious (2017) - Additional visual effects 
CHiPs (2017) - End credits 
Black Sails (season 4) (2017) - Additional visual effects 
The Shack (2017) - Main titles and end titles, Additional visual effects 
Almost Christmas (2016) - Additional visual effects 
Doctor Strange (2016) - Additional visual effects and end credits 
Miss Peregrine's Home for Peculiar Children (2016) - Additional visual effects 
Pete's Dragon (2016) - Additional visual effects 
X-Men: Apocalypse (2016) - Additional visual effects 
Captain America: Civil War (2016) - Additional visual effects and end credits 
Game of Thrones (season 6) (2016) - Additional visual effects, and roto work 
Alvin and the Chipmunks: The Road Chip (2015) - Additional visual effects 
The Hunger Games: Mockingjay - Part 2 (2015) - Additional visual effects 
Ant-Man (2015) - Additional visual effects, and end credits 
Avengers: Age of Ultron (2015) - Additional visual effects and end credits 
The SpongeBob Movie: Sponge Out of Water (2015) - Additional visual effects 
The SpongeBob Movie: Sponge on the Run (2020) - Additional visual effects and end credits (with Scarlett Letters)
Dawn of the Planet of the Apes (2014) - VFX roto work in stereo 
American Hustle (2013) - Rotoscoping
Crazy Kind of Love (2013) - Titles
Lawless (2012) - End Credits
Aftermath/Remnants (2012/II) - Titles And Opticals
Judy Moody and the Not Bummer Summer (2011) - Titles

Awards and honors
2014: $7500 grant from the Academy of Motion Picture Arts and Sciences

Video clips and interviews
Cechanowicz, Laura. Exceptional Minds in Transition. Documentary film for the Interacting With Autism Website, USC School of Cinematic Arts, September 2013.
Dador, Denise. "Media Production Training for Adults with Autism." KABC-TV, June 6, 2014.
Sigell, Lisa. "Group Helps Kids With Autism Connect With Their Artistic Side." KCAL-TV, July 12, 2012.

https://people.com/human-interest/exceptional-minds-nonprofit-for-people-with-autism-teams-up-with-hbo-max-on-the-spectrum-series/

Notes

External links
 
 

American animation studios
Animation schools in the United States
Art schools in California
Art in Greater Los Angeles
Private schools in California
Schools for people on the autistic spectrum
Non-profit organizations based in Los Angeles
Autism-related organizations in the United States
2011 establishments in California
Mental health organizations in California
Private universities and colleges in California